Bibiani/Anhwiaso/Bekwai Municipal District is one of the nine districts in Western North Region, Ghana. Originally created as an ordinary district assembly in 1988 when it was known as Bibiani/Anhwiaso/Bekwai District, which it was later elevated to municipal district assembly status in March 2012 to become Bibiani/Anhwiaso/Bekwai Municipal District. The municipality is located in the northeast part of Western North Region and has Bibiani as its capital town.

Sources

References

Districts of the Western North Region